Tatyana Nikolayevna Savicheva, commonly referred to as Tanya Savicheva (23 January 1930 – 1 July 1944), was a Russian child diarist who endured the siege of Leningrad during World War II. During the siege, Savicheva recorded the successive deaths of each member of her family in her diary, with her final entry indicating her belief to be the sole living family member. Although Savicheva was rescued and transferred to a hospital, she succumbed to intestinal tuberculosis in July 1944 at age 14.

Savicheva's image and the pages from her diary became symbolic of the human cost of the siege of Leningrad, and she is remembered in St. Petersburg with a memorial complex on the Green Belt of Glory along the Road of Life. Her diary was used during the Nuremberg Trials as evidence of the Nazis’ crimes.

Early life
Savicheva was born on 23 January 1930, the youngest child in the family of a baker father, Nikolay Rodionovich Savichev, and a seamstress mother, Mariya Ignatievna Savicheva. Her father died when Tanya was six, leaving his widow with five children: three girls — Tanya, Zhenya (Yevgenia) and Nina — and two boys — Mikhail and Leka (Leonid). Mikhail had left Leningrad before war broke out. Whilst in German-occupied territory at Kingisepp Mikhail had joined the partisans. Mikhail's story was not known to the rest of his family who presumed him to be dead.

The family planned to spend the summer of 1941 in the countryside, but the Axis invasion of the Soviet Union on 22 June disrupted their plans. All, except Mikhail (Misha), who had already left, decided to stay in Leningrad. Each of them worked to support the army: Mariya Ignatievna sewed uniforms, Leka worked as a plane operator in the Admiralty, Zhenya worked at the munitions factory, Nina helped in the construction of city defences and worked at the munitions factory with her sister, and her uncles Vasya and Lesha served in the anti-aircraft defence. Tanya, then 11 years old, dug trenches and put out firebombs. One day Nina went to work and never came back; she was sent to Lake Ladoga and then urgently evacuated. The family was unaware of this and presumed she had died.

Origins of the diary
Tanya had kept a real diary in previous months. This diary had been a large, thick notebook in which she recorded her day-to-day life, but the family had decided to burn it at some point early on in the siege when there was no fuel left to heat the stove. Some time after the burning of her diary Savicheva was given a small notebook that had belonged to her sister, Nina, which would later become her diary. The smaller notebook had been spared the fire and Nina had used it to make notes about the boiler equipment in the plant where she worked. Nina had not used the alphabetised portion of the notebook.

Tanya wrote her first entry in the diary on or shortly after 28 December. This first entry concerned the death of her elder sister, Zhenya, which most likely occurred due to severe malnutrition exacerbated by her work at the munitions factory. Zhenya was born in 1909 and had left the family home when she married and had moved to Mokhovaya Street, where she continued to live after her divorce. Zhenya would regularly walk 7 kilometers (4 miles) to the factory where she worked sometimes two shifts a day making mine cases. After work she would donate blood. At this point during the siege of Leningrad, food rationing had been reduced to starvation level, and only small but inadequate supplies were coming into Leningrad across Lake Ladoga along the Road of Life. It is estimated 100,000 people per month were dying from starvation, rations for an adult having been set at 250g (9 oz) of rye bread or half that for children and the elderly. Her weakened body was not strong enough to stand the blood donations and she died in her apartment, from complications resulting from exhaustion and malnutrition, in the arms of her sister Nina who had been worried when she had not turned up for her shift at the factory and had hurried round to Mokhovaya Street to check on her.

Deaths
Savicheva began to record the deaths of each family member in Tanya's half empty work notebook. Each page had a letter heading; Savicheva chose the page headed by Russian letter ж and recorded the death of her sister with the following statement written probably in blue pencil, in large handwriting which filled the page, "Zhenya died on December 28th at 12 noon, 1941."

From here on, most of Tanya's family also died in quick succession. Her grandmother, Yevdokiya Grigorievna, died a month later, two days after Savicheva's twelfth birthday, of heart failure, having lost a third of her body weight. Yevdokiya Grigorievna refused to go to hospital as she felt the hospitals were overrun enough already. She was buried in a mass grave in what is today's Piskaryovskoye Memorial Cemetery where there is a memorial complex to the victims of the siege. Savicheva recorded her death under the page heading for the letter Б with the words, "Grandma died on the 25th of January at 3 o'clock, 1942."

Tanya later admitted that at the behest of their grandmother they postponed the burial and kept grandmother's ration card until the end of the month, thus the official date of her death was recorded as February 1, 1942.

On 28 February Nina disappeared. On the day of her disappearance Leningrad had come under heavy artillery fire and the remaining family presumed her to be dead. In fact Nina Savicheva had been evacuated without warning across Lake Ladoga on the dangerous Road of Life ice route. Nina had no opportunity to send word to any of her relatives, the ice route being reserved only for essential food, fuel, medicine and evacuation purposes. She remained ill for several months and was not able to return to Leningrad to find out what had happened to her family until 1945. Savicheva made no reference to Nina in the notebook. It was Nina who eventually found the diary on returning to Leningrad.

Grandmother's death was followed by Savicheva's brother Leka in March 1942. He had tried earlier in the war to enlist in the military but had been turned down because of nearsightedness. Leka had become a promising engineer, and was also a talented musician. He worked long shifts at the Admiralty Shipyard, often working a second shift into the night. He died in the shipyard's hospital on March 17, Savicheva hurriedly recording this in her diary under the letter Л, "Leka died March 17th, 1942, at 5 o'clock in the morning, 1942."

On April 13, Uncle Vasya (one of her father's brothers) died at the age of 56. Before the war three of Savicheva's uncles lived together in a nearby apartment but when the siege began the family moved in together. Uncle Vasya had served in the First World War but had been refused this time around on account of his age. Vasya and Tanya were said to be very close and Tanya spent many hours in Vasya's apartment which was filled with books. Savicheva recorded his death under the letter в, mixing up some of her grammar, with the words, "Uncle Vasya died on April 13th at 2 o'clock in the morning, 1942."

The death of her eldest uncle Lesha followed in May at the age of 71 from malnutrition. He too had tried to enlist in the military but was refused, being too old. Despite his age he remained active in the civilian effort in Leningrad. Savicheva recorded his death on the facing page of the letter Л and left off the word 'died'. "Uncle Lesha May 10th, at 4 o'clock in the afternoon, 1942"

Finally her mother died on the morning of May 13, 1942. Mariya Ignatievna Savicheva was born in 1889 and worked as a seamstress, which she continued during the civilian war effort by sewing soldiers' uniforms. Mariya had loved music and encouraged all her children to play in a family ensemble. Savicheva recorded her death under the letter М, again making grammatical errors and missing the word 'died', "Mama on May 13th at 7:30 in the morning, 1942."
Following the death of her mother it seems Savicheva lost hope and under three more letters: С, У and О she filled three more pages with the words,
 
 

"The Savichevs are dead." "Everyone is dead." "Only Tanya is left."

After her rescue
After the death of her mother, Savicheva stayed with a neighbour the next night and then, although severely weakened, took the family's personal belongings to the house of her aunt Evdokiya (Dusya). Her aunt, hoping Savicheva might receive urgent medical care, then transferred custody of Savicheva to public orphanage number 48 in the Smolny area of St. Petersburg. In August 1942, Tanya was one of the 140 children who were rescued from Leningrad and brought to the village of Krasny Bor. Anastasiya Karpova, a teacher in the Krasny Bor orphanage, wrote to Tanya's brother Mikhail, who happened to be outside of Leningrad in 1941: "Tanya is now alive, but she doesn't look healthy. A doctor, who visited her recently, says she is very ill. She needs rest, special care, nutrition, better climate and, most of all, tender motherly care." In May 1944, Tanya was sent to a hospital in Shatki, where she died a month later, on 1 July, of intestinal tuberculosis.

Nina Savicheva and Mikhail Savichev returned to Leningrad after World War II. Mikhail had continued fighting until 1944, sustaining injuries which led to him being discharged and transported back to Leningrad. Tanya's diary is now displayed at the Museum of Leningrad History, with a copy also on display at the Piskaryovskoye Memorial Cemetery.
 According to several sources, one of the documents presented by the Allied prosecutors during the Nuremberg Trials was the small notebook that once belonged to Tanya.

Contents of the diary

Legacy

Tanya and her diary have become an iconic image of the victims of the siege of Leningrad in the postwar Soviet Union. In 1968 a memorial was constructed in her honor which was later expanded to a memorial complex. The memorial complex, known as "The Flower of Life" («Цветок жизни») consists of a large stone flower designed by A.D. Levyenkov and P.I. Melnikov and eight stone tabets representing pages of her diary where she writes of the members of her family who died, designed by Levyenkov, G.G. Fetisov, and engineer M.V. Koman. It is located on the Green Belt of Glory near St. Petersburg. The memorial is dedicated to children who endured the siege of Leningrad.

At Krasny Bor cemetery where Savicheva is buried there is a red marble tomb with a grey marble grave stone depicting her image in bas relief, sculpted by T. Holueva. Close by is a tall stele with a monumental wall depicting carved pages from her diary.

Serbian poet Mika Antić penned a poem dedicated to Tanya Savicheva named "A lost rendez-vous".

2127 Tanya, a minor planet discovered in 1971 by Soviet astronomer Lyudmila Chernykh, is named in her honor.

There is also a mountain pass named after her in the Dzungarian Alatau mountain range which lies between Kazakhstan and China.

There are memorial plaques on the wall and in the courtyard of her home on Vasilievsky Island, St. Petersburg, and a museum housed in the school she attended.

Copies of the diary have been displayed in exhibitions around the world and the original is displayed at The State Museum of the History of St. Petersburg at Peter and Paul Fortress in St. Petersburg.

Gallery

See also

Mary Berg
Anne Frank
Věra Kohnová
 Yoko Moriwaki
Rutka Laskier
Lena Mukhina
Sadako Sasaki
List of posthumous publications of Holocaust victims

Notes

References

Cited works and further reading

External links

 The diary of Tanya Savicheva at pravmir.com

1930 births
1944 deaths
People from Gdovsky District
20th-century Russian women writers
20th-century Russian writers
Child writers
Children in war
International Military Tribunal in Nuremberg
Holocaust diarists
Russian children
20th-century Russian diarists
Women diarists
Russian people of World War II
Victims of the Siege of Leningrad
20th-century deaths from tuberculosis
Tuberculosis deaths in the Soviet Union
Tuberculosis deaths in Russia